The Hampton was a British car made by the Hampton Engineering Company which was based in Kings Norton, Birmingham from 1912 to 1918 and at Dudbridge in Stroud, Gloucestershire from 1918 to 1933

Early history
The company was founded by William Paddon who lived in Hampton-in-Arden, Warwickshire where he sold cars and also offered to manufacture light cars and motorcycles.  It is not known how many were actually made. In 1912 the Crowdy car company of Birmingham failed and the remains of that company was merged with Hampton Engineering and production moved to Kings Norton. The Crowdy 12/14 was fitted with a larger 1726 cc engine to become the Hampton 12/16.  A belt driven cyclecar, apparently designed by Paddon, the Hampton 8 with 968 cc V-twin-cylinder air-cooled engine joined the range in 1913 followed in 1914 by the Hampton 10, a 1244 cc water-cooled version with shaft drive.

Production stopped with the outbreak of World War I and the company went into receivership in 1915.

Post war
In 1919 the company was re-established as a joint venture between William Paddon and Charles Apperley of the Stroud Metal and Plating Company and production was transferred to Dudbridge, Stroud. The first post war car was the Hampton 11.9 with either a 1496 cc or 1795 cc Dorman four-cylinder engine but only a few were made before the money ran out and the company was bought by a major shareholder John Daniel and re-registered as Hampton Engineering Co (1920) Ltd. William Paddon left to join the Autocrat car company of Birmingham.

William Millward who had been with Charron-Laycock joined as Works manager and designer in 1923 and John Leno, son of music hall star Dan Leno became sales manager. In spite of sales of around 300 cars a year, Hampton failed again in 1924 but was reformed by Millward and Leno as the Stroud Motor Manufacturing Co. Ltd. A new, larger, model the Hampton 14, still with a 1496 cc engine, but now from Henry Meadows, was announced.

In 1925 a receiver was appointed yet again but Hampton bounced back again as Hampton Cars (London) Ltd with finance from businessman John Hatton-Hall.

The company moved to smaller premises at Selsley Hill and introduced a more up-market three-litre car with Meadows six-cylinder engine alongside the old 14 which was now called the 12/40 or with smaller 1247 cc engine, the Nine. This did not help finances and the receiver was in again in 1930.

Miraculously, Hampton rose again now registered as the Safety Suspension Car Co. Fifty Straight 8 2496 cc engines and 100 chassis were ordered from Rohr of Germany  to make the Empire Sportsman model. The spare 50 chassis were to be fitted with Continental 2414 cc six-cylinder engines.  One or two at most were made before the company failed for the last time and closed in 1933.

During its history, Hampton made about 1100 cars. Five cars are thought to survive.

Hampton Cars

Hampton 12/16

The 12/16 was a design obtained from the failed Crowdy car company fitted with a new side-valve engine.  The company brochure shows an open tourer model priced at GBP295.

Hampton 8

The Hampton 8 was a lightweight Cyclecar with two-cylinder engine bought in from Precision. The car had belt drive to the ear wheels.

Hampton 10

The Hampton 10 was offered for one year only and had a four-cylinder engine from either Ballot or Chapuis-Dornier.

Hampton 10/16

This model had a variety of names, the 9.8, 10/16, 11.9 and 11/35. The 10/16 had a 1496 cc and the 11.9 and 11/35 a 1795 cc  four-cylinder engine both bought in from Dorman. Although both models shared the same chassis the larger-engined car was longer overall by 12 inches (3050 mm).

The standard body built by Hampton was an open two-seater available in dark biscuit or lavender and priced at GBP520. The suspension used semi-elliptic leaf springs at the front and three-quarter elliptic at the rear.

Several of the cars were used in motor sport competition.

Hampton 14

The 14 was a larger-engined and longer version of the 9/21 with the engine now made by Henry Meadows, but probably to the Dorman design used previously.  The gearbox now had four speeds. The suspension used half-elliptic springs on both axles.

A tourer cost GBP500 in 1923 but the price fell over the years to GBP315.  A supercharger was possibly an option on some of the late cars, showing Hampton still had sporting interests.

Hampton nine

The Nine, also called the Junior, T10, 9/21 or 10 was a smaller version of the 14 with a shorter chassis.

Hampton 20

The 20 was the first of a new range of larger cars with a Meadows engine and twin Zenith carburettors.  It was also available with a German Röhr eighth cylinder engine  of 2262 cc as the 8/18 model.

Tourer and saloon bodies were available from GBP450.

Few cars, probably less than 100 were made.

Hampton 3-litre

This model was possibly a rebranding of the 20 with larger Meadows engine.

Hampton Eight/Empire Sportsman

The final model used a Röhr chassis with independent suspension all round.  At the front a transverse leaf spring was used.  Servo brakes were fitted.  The eight-cylinder engine was also by Röhr, but the six was probably a Continental unit.

Although 50 of the eight-cylinder engine were ordered, it is thought that very few cars were made.

See also
 List of car manufacturers of the United Kingdom

References

Vintage vehicles
Defunct motor vehicle manufacturers of England